Philonome euryarga is a species of moth of the  family Tineidae. It is found in Guyana and French Guiana.

The length of the forewings is about 2.7 mm. The forewings are reddish brown with a brown costa. The longitudinal fascia is white, spanning the entire costal area except the costa. The lower margin is sinuous, accompanied with a narrow, dark brown line. The dorsal bar is white and found at the basal third of the dorsum. It is dentiform and accompanied with a dark brown bar along the upper margin. The marginal area is dark brown. The hindwings are pale greyish orange.

References

Moths described in 1915
Tineidae